This is a list of Native American place names in the U.S. state of Virginia.

Listings

Counties

 Accomack County
 Alleghany County
 Alleghany
 Alleghany Springs
 Alleghany Mountain
 Appomattox County
 Town of Appomattox
 Appomattox River
 Appomattox-Buckingham State Forest
 Nottoway County
 Village of Nottoway
 District of Nottaway
 Nottoway River
 Little Nottoway River
 Nottoway Lake
 Nottoway Swamp
 Powhatan County – named after the Powhatan people.
 Powhatan State Park
 Powhatan Wildlife Management Area
 Rappahannock County
 Rappahannock River
 Rappahannock Mountain
 Roanoke County
 City of Roanoke
 District of Roanoke
 Roanoke River
 Roanoke Creek
 Roanoke Valley
 Roanoke Mountain
 Shenandoah County
 Shenandoah River
 North Fork Shenandoah River
 South Fork Shenandoah River
 Shenandoah River State Park
 Shenandoah Mountain
 Shenandoah Caverns
 Shenandoah Valley
 Shenandoah National Park

Settlements

 Accotink
 Lake Accotink
 Accotink Creek
 Accomac
 Achash
 Alcoma
 Amonate
 Appalachia
 Aquia
 Aquia Harbour
 Assawoman
 Atoka
 Atoka Historic District
 Cana
 Canada
 Catalpa
 Chesapeake
 Chesapeake Bay
 Chickahominy – named after the Chickahominy people.
 Chickahominy (Hanover County)
 Chickahominy River
 Chickahominy Wildlife Management Area
 Chilhowie
 Chincoteague
 Chincoteague Island
 Chincoteague National Wildlife Refuge
 Elko Tract
 Hiwassee
 Keokee
 Konnarock
 Marumsco – from the Algonquin word for "island rock".
 Massanetta Springs
 Matoaca – after Pocahontas's birthname, Matoaka.
 District of Matoaca
 Massanutten
 Massanutten Mountain
 Massaponax
 Mattaponi – named after the Mattaponi people.
 Mattaponi River
 Mattaponi Wildlife Management Area
 Mattaponi Bluffs Wildlife Management Area
 Meherrin – named after the Meherrin people.
 Meherrin River
 North Meherrin River
 Middle Meherrin River
 South Meherrin River
 Merrimac
 Metompkin
 Metompkin Island 
 Nassawadox
 Occoquan
 Occoquan River
 Occoquan Creek
 Occoquan Reservoir
 Occoquan Bay National Wildlife Refuge
 Onancock
 Opequon
 Oriskany
 Passapatanzy
 Pocahontas
 Pocahontas State Park
 Poquoson
 Poquoson River
 Potomac Yard
 Potomac Mills
 Potomac River
 Potomac Creek
 Potomac Water Gap
 Pungoteague – from Algonquin word "Pungotekw", meaning "sand fly river".
 Quantico
 Quantico Creek
 Seneca
 Seneca River
 Shawnee
 Shockoe Bottom
 Shockoe Hill
 Shockoe Slip
 Upper Shockoe Valley
 Shockoe Creek
 Tappahannock
 Tobacco Row
 Totaro
 District of Totaro
 Tuckahoe
 District of Tuckahoe
 Wachapreague
 Wingina
 Zuni

Bodies of water

 Accokeek Creek
 Assamoosick Swamp
 Big Moccasin Creek
 Catawba Creek
 Catoctin Creek
 North Fork Catoctin Creek
 South Fork Catoctin Creek
 Chopawamsic Creek
 Chotank Creek
 Chotank Creek Natural Area Preserve
 Chuckatuck Creek
 Corrotoman River
 Diascund Creek
 Diascund Reservoir
 Dogue Creek
 Great Wicomico River
 Hyco River
 Keokee Lake
 Lake Manassas
 Little Wicomico River
 Mattox Creek
 Machipongo River
 Maracossic Creek
 Mat River
 Matta River
 Mechums River
 Mechunk Creek
 Namozine Creek
 Nansemond River – named after the Nansemond people.
 Nansemond National Wildlife Refuge
 Neabsco Creek
 Maggodee Creek
 Ni River
 Ni Reservoir
 Occohannock Creek
 Occupacia Creek
 Opequon Creek
 Pamunkey River – named after the Pamunkey people.
 Pamunkey Creek
 Piankatank River
 Piscataway Creek
 Po River
 Pocaty River
 Pocomoke Sound
 Pocomoke Sound Wildlife Management Area
 Pohick Creek
 Poni River
 Poropotank River
 Possum Creek
 Powhite Creek
 Pungoteague Creek
 Racoon Creek
 Rowanty Creek
 Sappony Creek
 Ta River
 Tommeheton Creek
 Totuskey Creek
 Upper Chippokes Creek
 Upper Machodoc Creek
 Waqua Creek
 Yeocomico River
 Northwest Yeocomico River
 South Yeocomico River
 West Yeocomico River

Other

 Allegheny Mountains
 Assateague Island
 Catoctin Valley
 Catoctin Mountain
 Chippokes State Park
 Kiptopeke State Park
 Machicomoco State Park
 Manassas Gap
 Merrimac Farm Wildlife Management Area
 Mottesheard
 Occoneechee State Park
 Shockoe Valley
 Turkeycock Mountain
 Turkeycock Wildlife Management Area

See also
List of place names in the United States of Native American origin

References

Citations

Sources

 Bright, William (2004). Native American Placenames of the United States. Norman: University of Oklahoma Press. .

 
History of Virginia
Virginia geography-related lists
Native American history of Virginia